The 2009 UEFA European Under-21 Championship began on 15 June 2009, and was the 17th UEFA European Under-21 Championship. This was the first tournament after the competition reverted to a two-year format, following the single-year 2006–07 competition, which allowed the change to odd-numbered years. Sweden hosted the final tournament in June 2009; therefore, their under-21 team qualified automatically. Players born on or after 1 January 1986 were eligible to play in this competition.

Qualification

The qualifying draw split the nations onto 10 groups of 5 or 6 teams. The seeding pots are formed on the basis of former performance in the tournament. Ten group winners along with four best-ranked runners-up advanced to the play-offs. Seven winners of the play-off pairs qualified for the final tournament.

Qualified teams
 as host nation

The finals' tournament draw took place on 3 December 2008 at the Svenska Mässan exhibition centre, Gothenburg. Prior to the final draw, Sweden had been seeded first in Group A as hosts of the tournament, while Spain were seeded first in Group B.

Final draw
Pot A
 assigned to A1
 assigned to B1

Pot B

Pot C

The first pot contained the top seeds, these would have been host nation Sweden and the reigning champions, The Netherlands. However, The Netherlands did not qualify meaning that the team with the best qualifying record, Spain, took their place. Sweden and Spain were then automatically assigned to A1 and B1 respectively. The second pot contained the teams with the next two best records in qualifying: these were England and Italy. England were drawn into position B3 and Italy into A3. The final pot contained the other four qualified teams: Serbia, Finland, Germany and Belarus. Belarus were drawn first into position A2, Germany went into B2, Serbia into A4 and Finland into B4.

Venues

The following venues were chosen to hold the final tournament matches:

Sponsorship issues

Following the refusal of the Swedish hamburger chain Max to close their restaurant at Borås Arena during the tournament (as they are not an official UEFA sponsor), UEFA disqualified Borås Arena from hosting games during the tournament. There is a contract between UEFA and the city and between UEFA and its sponsors saying that the UEFA sponsors shall have monopoly around the arena. A city cannot force Max to close down even if it happened to sign a contract with someone saying so, as Max have a tenancy agreement with the city.

On 2 September 2008, the Swedish Football Association nominated Örjans Vall in Halmstad as a replacement venue for Borås Arena, and they officially became the fourth host city a few days later. They were awarded the three group stage games that were to be hosted by Borås Arena, while the second semi-final was moved from Borås to Helsingborg and Olympia.

Swedbank Stadion was referred to as Malmö New Stadium during the tournament, as Swedbank – which owned the naming rights to the stadium at the time – were not official UEFA sponsors.

Squads

Matches
All times are Central European Summer Time (UTC+2).

Group stage

Group A

Group B

Knockout stage

Semi-finals

Final

Goalscorers

7 goals
 Marcus Berg
3 goals
 Robert Acquafresca
 Ola Toivonen
2 goals
 Syarhey Kislyak
 Gonzalo Castro
 Sandro Wagner
1 goal
 Fraizer Campbell
 Lee Cattermole
 Martin Cranie
 James Milner
 Nedum Onuoha
 Micah Richards
 Jack Rodwell

1 goal, cont.
 Tim Sparv
 Andreas Beck
 Ashkan Dejagah
 Benedikt Höwedes
 Mesut Özil
 Mario Balotelli
 Gojko Kačar
 Pedro León
 Marc Torrejón
 Gustav Svensson
Own goals
 Alyaksandr Martynovich (for Sweden)
 Mattias Bjärsmyr (for England)

Match ball
The match ball for the competition is called the Adidas Terrapass, which was unveiled at the tournament draw in Gothenburg on 3 December. The ball is bright blue and yellow, the colours of the Swedish flag. It features 12 watermarks including one containing a map of Europe and one of the tournament logo. It is composed of 14 thermally bonded panels, which are claimed to improve the ball's accuracy and swerve.

References

External links

 Official site 
 uefa.com – UEFA European U-21 Championship
 uefa.com – Regulations of the UEFA European Under-21 Championship 2007/09

 
UEFA European Under-21 Championship
International association football competitions hosted by Sweden
2009
UEFA
June 2009 sports events in Europe
2009 in youth association football
2000s in Malmö
2000s in Gothenburg
International sports competitions in Malmö
Sports competitions in Helsingborg
Sports competitions in Halmstad
International sports competitions in Gothenburg
21st century in Skåne County